Polyhaline is a salinity category term applied to brackish estuaries and other water bodies with a salinity between 18 and 30 parts per thousand. It is the most dense saltwater type that is classified as "brackish."

See also
 Salinity

Aquatic ecology